The Electricity (Supply) Act 1919 (9 & 10 Geo. 5. c. 100) was an Act of the Parliament of the United Kingdom which amended the law with respect to the supply of electricity. It established the statutory body of the Electricity Commissioners ‘to promote, regulate and supervise the supply of electricity’ under the direction of the Board of Trade. It provided for the formation of electricity districts and, where necessary, the establishment of joint electricity authorities, ‘to provide or secure the provision of a cheap and abundant supply of electricity’.

Background 
In 1917, the UK government was planning the reconstruction of the nation's industries after the First World War. The Board of Trade set up the Electric Power Supply Committee, chaired by Sir Archibald Williamson, which proposed the effective nationalisation of the industry.

Subsequently, in 1919 under the chairmanship of Sir Henry Birchenough, the Advisory Council to the Ministry of Reconstruction produced the Report of the Committee of Chairmen on Electric Power Supply. The committee were asked to submit general comments or suggestions on the broad administrative and commercial issues which had arisen out of the Williamson Report. The Birchenough Committee generally agreed with the Williamson Report but recommended that generation and transmission should be a single unified system with state regulation and finance and that means should be found for including distribution as well. This recommendation was very far-sighted but considered too ambitious by the government. If acted upon it would have anticipated the Electricity Act 1947 by 28 years.

Parliament rejected what would have been the effective nationalisation of the industry but enacted two of the committee's recommendations in a weaker form, including the setting up of the Electricity Commissioners and a number of joint electricity authorities formed by the electricity suppliers in each area.

The Electricity (Supply) Act 1919, was based essentially on the Williamson and Birchenough reports and introduced central co-ordination by establishing the Electricity Commissioners, an official body responsible for securing reorganisation on a regional basis.

The Electricity (Supply) Act 1919 
The Electricity (Supply) Act 1919 received Royal Assent on 23 December 1919. Its long title is: ’An Act to amend the Law with respect to the supply of electricity’.

Provisions 
The provisions of the Act were as follows.

Electricity Commissioners

To established a body called the Electricity Commissioners to promote, regulate and supervise the supply of electricity (section 1 (1)).  The number of commissioners and their duties (section 1 (2–8). The Board of Trade to exercise its duties through the Commissioners (section 3). Commissioners to conduct experiments on electricity supply (section 3). Appointment of advisory committee (section 4).

Reorganisation of supply of electricity 

Determination of electricity districts (section 5). Establishment of joint electricity authorities (section 6). Making orders to confirm schemes (section 7). Powers and duties of joint electricity authorities (section 8).

Generating stations

A joint electricity authority may own a generating station or main transmission line (section 9) and acquire land (section 10). Extensions and new stations require consent of the commissioners (section 11).

Powers of joint electricity authorities

Powers of joint electricity authorities (section 12). Transfer of undertakings to joint electricity authorities (section 13), Power companies and joint electricity authorities (section 14), subsidiary powers such as abstraction of water, waste heat, by-product plant (section 15). Deprivation of employment (section 16), plans for capital expenditure (section 17).

Transitory provisions

Construction of interim works (section 18), mutual assistance between undertakings permitted (section  19).

Amendments of Electric Lighting Acts

Transfer of powers of the Ministry of Health, the Scottish Office and London County Council (section 20). Wayleaves (section  22), supply of apparatus (section 23), alteration of type of current (section 24). Amendment of 1882 Act (section 25), substitution of special for provisional orders (section 26), requirement for accounts (section 27).

Financial provisions

Revenue and expenditure of joint electricity authorities (section 28), expenses and appropriation of Electricity Commissioners (section 29), other expenses (section 30).

General

Agreements and arrangements (section 32). Holding inquiries (section 33), power to make rules (section 34). Special orders (section 35). Definitions (section 36). Application to Scotland and Ireland (sections 37 and 38). Transfer of powers of Board of Trade to Minister of Transport (section 39). Short title and construction (section 40).

Schedule relating to section 35.

Joint electricity authorities 
Four joint electricity authorities were established after the Electricity (Supply) Act 1922 had enabled then to borrow money to finance electricity schemes.

North Wales & South Cheshire Joint Electricity Authority 
The North Wales and South Cheshire Joint Electricity Authority was formed in 1923. The principal electricity undertaking was North Wales Power Company which, under the supervision of the Joint Electricity Authority, controlled generation and transmission and supplied electricity to local undertakings in the area with the exception of Chester. Upon abolition in 1948 the joint electricity authority’s assets were transferred to the Merseyside & North Wales Electricity Board (MANWEB).

London and Home Counties Joint Electricity Authority 

The London and Home Counties Joint Electricity Authority was established in 1925 to "provide or secure the provision of a cheap and abundant supply of electricity within the district".  The district covered 1,841 square miles including the whole of the counties of London and Middlesex, and parts of Hertfordshire, Essex, Kent, Surrey, Buckinghamshire, and Berkshire.  Upon abolition in 1948 the JEA’s assets were split between the South Eastern Electricity Board, the Eastern Electricity Board and the London Electricity Board.

West Midlands Joint Electricity Authority 
The West Midlands Joint Electricity Authority was established in 1925 by the West Midlands Electricity District Order 1925 made under the Electricity (Supply) Act 1919. It covered an area of about 1,000 square miles, including much of Shropshire, Staffordshire and Worcestershire. The JEA included representatives of Midland Electricity Corporation; Wolverhampton, Walsall, West Bromwich, Cannock and Shrewsbury councils; colliery owners; railway companies; and electricity industry workers. In 1928 it acquired four power stations: Ocker Hill formerly operated by the Midland Electric Corporation for Power Distribution; the 30 MW Wolverhampton power station; the 28 MW Walsall Birchills power station; and the 6.65 MW West Bromwich station. The joint electricity authority built the 200 MW Ironbridge A power station (1932). The JEA’s stations were linked through a system operating at 33 kV. On 1 October 1938 the JEA took over Shrewsbury power station. The JEA’s principal office was at Phoenix Buildings, Dudley Road, Wolverhampton. Upon abolition in 1948 the JEA’s assets were transferred to the Midlands Electricity Board.

North West Midlands Joint Electricity Authority 
The North West Midlands Joint Electricity Authority was established by the North West Midlands Electricity District Order 1928. It covered an area of 800 square miles of Staffordshire, Shropshire and Cheshire including Stoke-on-Trent. It acquired the Stoke-on-Trent and Stafford power stations on 1 April 1930. Thereafter Stoke Corporation and Stafford Corporation purchased electricity in bulk from the JEA. It was based in York Chambers, Kingsway, Stoke-on-Trent. The joint electricity authority built the 120 MW Meaford A power station first commissioned in 1947. Upon abolition in 1948 the JEA’s supply assets were transferred to the Midlands Electricity Board, with generating assets going to the British Electricity Authority.

Later enactments 
The Electricity (Supply) Act 1922 (12 & 13 Geo. 5. c. 46). Enabled joint electricity authorities to borrow money to finance electricity schemes.

The London Electricity (Nos. 1 & 2) Acts 1925 (14 & 15 Geo. 5) permitted the London and Home Counties Joint Electricity Authority to purchase company electricity undertakings in London area in 1971.

The Electricity (Supply) Act 1926 (16 & 17 Geo. 5. c. 51), established the Central Electricity Board.

The Electricity Act 1947 (10 & 11 Geo. 6, c. 54), nationalised the UK electricity supply industry. The Electricity Commissioners and the joint electricity authorities were abolished. The ownership of electricity generation and transmission facilities were vested in the British Electricity Authority, and electricity distribution and sales in local electricity boards.

The 1919 Act and most other electricity-related British legislation were repealed and replaced by the Electricity Act 1989.

See also 

 Electric Lighting Acts 1882 to 1909
 Electricity (Supply) Act 1922
 Electricity (Supply) Act 1935
 Electricity Act 1947
 Electricity Act 1957
 Electricity Act 1989
 Timeline of the UK electricity supply industry

References 

United Kingdom Acts of Parliament 1919
1919 in England
Electric power in the United Kingdom